Gold Ridge may refer to:
 Gold Ridge (mine), in the Solomon Islands
 Gold Ridge, California, in El Dorado County
 Camptonville, California, formerly named Gold Ridge
 Luther Burbank's Gold Ridge Experiment Farm, in California
 Gold Ridge, Georgia